Gadriel may refer to:

Angels (Marvel Comics) one of the Grigori
 or Gadreel, fallen angel called Gadriel ('wall of God') in Chapter 68 of Book of Enoch